Sin noticias de Holanda (in English: No News From Holland) is Spanish pop singer Melendi's début album. It sold over 400,000 albums, and was later reissued with three new songs.

Track listing 

 "Mi rumbita pa tus pies"
 "Desde mi ventana"
 "Sé lo que hicistes"
 "Sin noticias de Holanda"
 "Un recuerdo que olvidar"
 "Con la luna llena"
 "Hablando en plata"
 "El informe del forense"
 "Vuelvo a traficar"
 "Una historia de tantas"
 "Contando primaveras"
 "Asturias" (Reissue)
 "Moratalá" (Reissue)
 "Trae pa´ k esa yerba güena"(Reissue)

Melendi albums
2003 debut albums